Gigafactory or GigaFactory is a generic term referring to "...facilities that produce batteries for electric vehicles on a large scale". The term was initially used by the electric car manufacturer Tesla, Inc. to refer to their battery manufacturing facilities. The concept's success has led to the genericization of the term.

Tesla Gigafactories
Gigafactory may refer to the following Tesla factories:

 Gigafactory 1 (officially named Giga Nevada) in Storey County, Nevada, U.S.
 Gigafactory 2 (officially named Giga New York), in Buffalo, New York, U.S.
 Gigafactory 3 (officially named Giga Shanghai), in Pudong, Shanghai, China
 Gigafactory 4 (officially named Giga Berlin), in Grünheide, state of Brandenburg (near Berlin), Germany
 Gigafactory 5 (officially named Giga Texas), in Austin, Texas, U.S.
 Gigafactory 6 (officially named Giga Mexico), in Santa Catarina (near Monterrey), Nuevo Leon, Mexico.

See also
Britishvolt
Tesla Factory, in Fremont, California, U.S.
Tesla facilities in Tilburg, Netherlands

References

Tesla factories